The Victor Borge Show is a 30-minute American variety television program that was broadcast live on NBC from February 3, 1951, to June 30, 1951. It was sponsored by Kellogg.

Premise 
The program starred Victor Borge, an "internationally known pianist and comic interpreter of music". Episodes usually included Borge's playing both a straight concert piece and a humorous interpretation. The Phil Engalls Orchestra provided musical support. Episodes also included guest stars who performed and chatted with Borge.

Perry Lafferty was the director, with Borge, Eddie Lawrence, and Max Wilk as writers. The program was a mid-season replacement for the Hank McCune Show. Its network competitors were Hollywood Theatre Time on ABC and The Sam Levenson Show on CBS. It was replaced by Tom Corbett, Space Cadet.

A review in the trade publication Billboard said: "This is not a program which produces multitudes of belly laughs. But it is filled with sly good humor and clever satire."

Problems 
Borge "was better in guest spots than having his own show." Lafferty said years later that trying to convert Borge's talented, but specialized, skills into a TV program "was the hardest thing in my career." Lawrence and Wilk managed to create new routines each week even though, as Lafferty said, "Borge fought everything we tried to do." One of the skits had Borge encountering difficulty trying to play a song, but other people walked in and played it perfectly.

Radio
Borge's television series was preceded by The Victor Borge Show on radio. Four versions of the program were broadcast on network radio.

Source: On the Air: The Encyclopedia of Old-Time Radio

References 

1951 American television series debuts
1951 American television series endings
1950s American variety television series
English-language television shows
NBC original programming